Imvepi Refugee Settlement is a refugee camp in Terego District (formerly part of Arua District) in West Nile Sub Region of northwestern Uganda.

Background 
The Imvepi refugee settlement, one of the newest opened, was established in February 2017 to accommodate South Sudanese asylum seekers fleeing the War at their country of origin; after the Palorinya refugee settlement in Moyo District quickly reached its full capacity and could not receive more number of immigrants because the influx needed an increase in the space provided and Imvepi refugee settlement was just the right option.

History 
Imvepi was and still remains a village, before and after the influx of the refugees, located in Maracha District, Odupi Sub County, Terego county in Uganda. It is divided into three zones; 3 in the West; zone 2 in the Central and zone 1 in the East.

Education 
Refugee parents reported children walk long distances to access education services and the school facilities being far and wide took most of their time and often costed them periods to accomplish in class.

Primary Schools and their locations 

 Annex Primary School   located in village 5 zone 1
 Longamere Primary School  located in village 9 zone 1
 Emmanuel primary school    located in village 1 zone 1
 Imvepi primary school   located in village 16 zone 2
 Torit primary school    located in village 18 zone 2
 Inyau primary school   located in the host community along imvepi Arua road near Yinga health centre 3
 Unity primary school located in village 4 zone 3
 Lanya primary school  located in village 14 zone 2
 Equatoria primary school   located in village 9 zone 3

Water and Sanitation 

According to UNICEF a total 70 per cent of refugees in Imvepi refugee Settlement have latrines which is a dire contribution for the improvement of the health and sanitation of those living in and around the refugee settlement of Imvepi and a good indicator that things are getting into control and the refugees at good hands. despite the fact that things are getting in to full control, refugees have to walk miles in search of water most especially during the dry spell and the long que at water points become delaying factor that they face.

References

Refugee camps in Uganda
Terego District
Populated places in Northern Region, Uganda